Titus is a 20% complete obsidian black skeleton of a Tyrannosaurus discovered in Montana's Hell Creek Formation in 2014 and excavated in 2018. Titus was on display as the centrepiece of an exhibition at the Nottingham Natural History Museum, England, from July 2021 to August 2022. According to the Nottingham City Council, it is also a rare instance of an actual Tyrannosaurus fossil leaving North America. The exhibit includes 3D scanned replicas of the skeleton, which visitors can inspect and handle, He is named after the protagonist in Shakespeare's Titus Andronicus and will remain at the museum after the display ends. The owner of Titus remains anonymous.

Description
It is named after the protagonist in Shakespeare's Titus Andronicus. External bone inspection has revealed injuries to Titus' right tibia (possibly a claw or bite wound); a deformed toe on the right foot; and a bitten and healed tail. The bite wound near the end of the tail indicates a possible attack by another Tyrannosaurus.

Discovery
In September 2014, commercial paleontologist Craig Pfister first discovered the remains of Titus near Ekalaka, Carter County, Montana. The site was an ancient river channel whence the specimen may have been transported in a flood event which also winnowed the skeleton and may in part explain why only 20% of the bones were preserved. Pfister originally found a broken tibia, and said he knew right away that it belonged to a Tyrannosaurus rex, but was sidetracked by the discovery of a nearby Triceratops. Excavation of the specimen began in 2018, and took 18 months.

Reconstruction and exhibition 

The bones of Titus were shipped to conservationist Nigel Larkin in the UK, who assessed and conserved the bones. Larkin reconstructed the mount using a cast of the Tyrannosaurus specimen Stan to supplement the known bones of "Titus", after scanning the bones using photogrammetry to create digital models that were 3D printed for use in the exhibition, alongside the display of the real fossil skeleton. For the exhibit at the Nottingham Natural History Museum at Wollaton Hall, Titus was reconstructed "in a walking mode, perhaps searching for prey or returning home after a hunt." The exhibition ran from July 2021 to August 2022.

According to the museum, this is the first time that a "real" fossilised Tyrannosaurus rex has been shown in England for more than 100 years. According to the Nottingham city council, it is also a rare instance of an actual Tyrannosaurus fossil leaving North America.

See also 
 Specimens of Tyrannosaurus
 Timeline of tyrannosaur research

References

Notes

Citations

External links 

 Titus: T.Rex Is King, exhibition page, Wollaton Hall, 2022

Paleontology in Montana
Tyrannosaurus
Cretaceous fossil record
Dinosaur fossils